"Me and You" is German synthpop group Camouflage's sixteenth single, taken from their sixth studio album Sensor and released in April 2003.

The single was backed with a radio edit, two remixes and also a remix of album track "Perfect". A remix single was also released in Europe, which featured additional remixes from Humate, Smallboy and Warp Acht. The Warp Acht remix was later added to "Sensor" as a bonus track.

Music video

The music video features Marcus' reflection on the walls of a train station, while various people observe and carry around portraits of the band members, which also feature on the single cover. Marcus is also shown singing in a studio on several television screens.

Track listings

CD single (Europe, 2003)
 "Me and You" (radio version) – 3:31
 "Me and You" (F.E.O.S. and Sniper Mode Downbeat mix) – 5:09
 "Me and You" (Kaycee's Downbeat mix) – 5:44
 "Perfect" (Huntemann and Bodzin mix) – 4:37

12" single (Germany, 2003)
 "Me and You" (Humate mix) – 8:50
 "Me and You" (F.E.O.S. Tech mix) – 7:16
 "Me and You" (Smallboy mix) – 4:39

Remix CD single (Europe, 2003)
 "Me and You" (Humate mix) – 8:49
 "Me and You" (Smallboy mix) – 4:39
 "Me and You" (F.E.O.S. Tech mix) – 7:16
 "Me and You" (Warp Acht mix) – 6:23

References
http://www.discogs.com/Camouflage-Me-And-You/master/7828http://www.camouflage-music.com/index.php?menu=discography&vid=24

2003 singles
Camouflage (band) songs
2003 songs
Polydor Records singles
Songs written by Heiko Maile